Chase Pistone (born August 20, 1983) is an American professional stock car racing driver who has competed in the NASCAR Xfinity, Truck, and ARCA Series. He is the grandson of 2-time NASCAR Cup Series race winner "Tiger" Tom Pistone. Pistone is also a car builder of Legends Cars and Super Late Models.

Racing career

Early career
Pistone began racing at age six. He won the Summer Shootout Championship Legends  four times as a driver (2 Semi-Pro, 2 Pro) between 1999 and 2005. He has over 80 feature event wins in Legends, Late Model, and USAR competition.

Prior to 2014, Pistone had only run 2 races in any of NASCAR's top three touring divisions. He made one Truck start in the No. 07 for Green Light Racing at Martinsville Speedway in 2005, finishing 35th. In 2006, Pistone returned to Martinsville for the Goody's 250 Busch race in the No. 32 for Braun Racing, finishing 37th after mechanical failure. He also has a top ten in his only ARCA start at Iowa Speedway in 2006 in the No. 50 Dodge for Bobby Jones Racing. He did try to make another ARCA start with the same team in 2007 ARCA Re/Max Series at the Daytona season-opener, but failed to qualify. This was his last attempt in NASCAR or ARCA until 2014.

In March 2014, Pistone returned to racing after being without a ride for seven years. Now at age 30, Pistone signed to drive the No. 9 Chevrolet Silverado of NTS Motorsports for 14 races. He finished 13th in his debut in the second race of the season, also at Martinsville, where Pistone had tested earlier in the month. Pistone finished a strong 9th in his next start at Gateway after qualifying 5th. In his return to Iowa Speedway, he moved up from the 17th starting spot to finish 12th.

Pistone also drove the No. 31 Chevrolet Camaro for Turner Scott Motorsports (the successor to Braun Racing) in the Nationwide Series in standalone oval races, while regular driver Dylan Kwasniewski takes over Kyle Larson's usual No. 42 Target car. Pistone's first two Nationwide starts in 2014 have both been at Iowa Speedway where he finished 14th and 18th. Pistone also drove the No. 31 at Kentucky Speedway in the fall.

Pistone did not return to either team in 2015 and was without a ride in any series. His return in 2014 ended up being for that one year only, and he has not raced since then.

Team owner career
In addition to his driving career, Pistone also owns CP Inc, building Legends and Late Model stock cars, and offering leasing programs that include cars, crews, and transportation. The company also provides setup tuning, repair services, and camber cut tires. As an owner/builder, Chase has won several championships with various drivers, former NTS Motorsports teammate Gray Gaulding.

Motorsports career results

NASCAR
(key) (Bold – Pole position awarded by qualifying time. Italics – Pole position earned by points standings or practice time. * – Most laps led.)

Nationwide Series

 Season still in progress 
 Ineligible for series points

Camping World Truck Series

ARCA Re/Max Series
(key) (Bold – Pole position awarded by qualifying time. Italics – Pole position earned by points standings or practice time. * – Most laps led.)

References

External links
 
 

Living people
1983 births
Racing drivers from Charlotte, North Carolina
NASCAR drivers
ARCA Menards Series drivers
CARS Tour drivers